Education in Japan is managed by the Ministry of Education, Culture, Sports, Science and Technology (MEXT) of Japan. Education is compulsory at the elementary and lower secondary levels. Most students attend public schools through the lower secondary level, but private education is popular at the upper secondary and university levels. Education prior to elementary school is provided at kindergartens and day-care centres. The programmes for those children aged 3–5 resemble those at kindergartens. The educational approach at kindergartens varies greatly from unstructured environments that emphasize play to highly structured environments that are focused on having the child pass the entrance exam at a private elementary school. The academic year starts from April and ends in March, having summer vacation in August and winter vacation in the end of December to the beginning of January.

Japanese students consistently rank highly among OECD students in terms of quality and performance in reading literacy, mathematics, and sciences. Japan is one of the top-performing OECD countries in reading literacy, mathematics and sciences on Programme for International Student Assessment (PISA) tests with the average student scoring 520, compared with the OECD average of 488, placing it eighth in the world in the 2018 ranking. Japan's populace is well educated and its society highly values education as a platform for socioeconomic mobility and for gaining employment in the country's high-tech economy. The country's large pool of highly educated and skilled individuals is largely responsible for ushering Japan's post-war economic growth. Tertiary-educated adults in Japan, particularly graduates in sciences and engineering, benefit economically and socially from their education and skills in the country's high tech economy. 

Spending on education as a proportion of GDP is 4.1 percent, which is below the OECD average of 5 percent. Although expenditure per student is comparatively high in Japan, total expenditure relative to GDP remains small. In 2020, the country ranked third for the percentage of 25-to-64-year-olds that have attained tertiary education with 52.7 percent. In addition, 61.5 percent of Japanese aged 25 to 34 have attained some form tertiary education and bachelor's degrees are held by 31.3 percent of Japanese aged 25 to 64, the second most in the OECD after South Korea. Japanese females are more highly educated compared to their Japanese male counterparts as 59 percent of Japanese women possess a university degree, compared to 52 percent of Japanese men. As the Japanese economy is largely scientifically and technologically based, its labor market demands people who have achieved some form of higher education, particularly related to science and engineering in order to gain a competitive edge when searching for employment opportunities. According to the MEXT, the percentage of Japanese going on to any higher education institution in the eighteen-year-old cohort was 80.6 percent, with 52.6 percent of students going on to a university, 4.7 percent to a junior college, 0.9 percent to a college of technology and the remaining 22.4 percent attending a correspondence school, the University of the Air or a specialized training college. Japan's education system played a central part in Japan's recovery and rapid economic growth in the decades following the end of World War II.

History

Formal education in Japan began with the adoption of Chinese culture, in the 6th century AD. Buddhist and Confucian teachings as well as sciences, calligraphy, divination and literature were taught at the courts of Asuka, Nara and Heian. Scholar officials were chosen through an Imperial examination system. But contrary to China, the system never fully took hold and titles and posts at the court remained hereditary family possessions. The rise of the bushi, the military class, during the Kamakura period ended the influence of scholar officials, but Buddhist monasteries remained influential centers of learning.

In the Edo period, the Yushima Seidō in Edo was the chief educational institution of the state; and at its head was the Daigaku-no-kami, a title which identified the leader of the Tokugawa training school for shogunate bureaucrats.

Under the Tokugawa shogunate, the daimyō vied for power in the largely pacified country. Since their influence could not be raised through war, they competed on the economic field. Their warrior-turned-bureaucrat Samurai elite had to be educated not only in military strategy and the martial arts, but also agriculture and accounting. Likewise, the wealthy merchant class needed education for their daily business, and their wealth allowed them to be patrons of arts and science. But temple schools (terakoya) educated peasants too, and it is estimated that at the end of the Edo period 50% of the male and 20% of the female population possessed some degree of literacy. Even though contact with foreign countries was restricted, books from China and Europe were eagerly imported and Rangaku ("Dutch studies") became a popular area of scholarly interest.

There were facilities that were created to specifically educate samurai and their children to perpetuate morality and mindfulness of their class. These schools, hanko schools, were where scholars would bring together samurai to listen to lectures on Confucianism, military arts, and other subjects. Samurai would then attempt to teach villagers what they had learned, "proper guidance to the common people's spirit and manners", by posting flyers and creating handbooks, Some Shōgun and Daimyō were also interested in spreading education throughout their protected land with the target audience as adult commoners and children. Elementary education was imparted as well as writing and morality lessons. The Shirakawa Village School's town bulletin explains the point of education for the commoners, "If not only the important people of the village but also the lesser people have continuous teaching from the appointed village schools, they will gain understanding".

'Commoners' would also form many communal gatherings to attempt and Englishmen themselves with the help of a scholar. To name one, Baigan Ishida, who was a great orator and writer that reached the outcropping of the merchant class. There were wakashu-gumi, or youth groups, that consisted of young men ages fourteen to seventeen, who at these groups learned about ceremonies, cooperative living, language, manners, marriage, straw weaving, and world information, not to mention talking and singing. Japan was thriving with the want for enlightenment. One may say the need for more education is one of the reasons why the Tokugawa Shogunate failed in 1868.

In 1858 Fukuzawa Yukichi founded a private school of Western studies which then became Keio University, known as a leading institute in Japanese higher education.

Meiji Restoration
After the Meiji Restoration of 1868, the methods and structures of Western learning were adopted as a means to make Japan a strong, modern nation. Students and even high-ranking government officials were sent abroad to study, such as the Iwakura mission. Foreign scholars, the so-called o-yatoi gaikokujin, were invited to teach at newly founded universities and military academies. Compulsory education was introduced, mainly after the Prussian model. In order to aid in the modernization the country, the Meiji government built a public library in 1872. The Japan Library Association (or the JLA) was founded in 1892 to promote the library. However, public education became the main focus of the Meiji government before they could strengthen the 
0 years after the resumption of full international relations, Japan discontinued employment of the foreign consultants.
  After 1890 Japan had numerous reformers, child experts, magazine editors, and well-educated mothers who bought into the new sensibility. They taught the upper middle class a model of childhood that included children having their own space where they read children's books, played with educational toys and, especially, devoted enormous time to school homework. These ideas rapidly disseminated through all social classes.

Post-WWII
After the defeat in World War II, the Allied occupation government set education reform as one of its primary goals, to eradicate militarist teachings and convert Japan into a pacifist democracy. Nine years of education was made mandatory, with six years in elementary education and three in junior high as an emulation of the American educational system. A number of reforms were carried out in the post-war period that aimed at easing the burden of entrance examinations, promoting internationalization and information technologies, diversifying education and supporting lifelong learning.

In an effort to ease Japanese postwar sentiments, any nationalistic, militaristic, authoritarian, or anti-American content was blackened from learning materials. This practice was known as suminuru, and was used as the primary method of educational reform until newly fashioned texts, Kuni no ayumi (Footsteps of the Nation), Nihon rekishi (Japanese History), and Minshushugi (Democracy) were written by the Ministry of Education and Civil Information and Education Section. The Ministry of Education is now known as the Ministry of Education, Culture, Sports, Science and Technology (MEXT) and is responsible for educational administration.

In successive international assessment tests, Japan's fourth- and eighth-grade students have consistently ranked in the top five globally in both mathematics and science (see TIMSS).

Despite concerns that academic skills for Japanese students may have declined since the mid-1990s, Japan's students showed a significant improvement in math and science scores in the 2011 TIMSS survey, compared to the 2007 scores.

Organization of the school system

School levels
The school year in Japan begins in April and classes are held from Monday to either Friday or Saturday, depending on the school. The school year consists of two or three terms, which are separated by short holidays in spring and winter, and a six-week-long summer break.

The year structure is summarized below:

Lower secondary school

Lower secondary school covers grades seven through nine, with children typically aged twelve through fifteen. There are 3.5 million primary school students in Japan as of 2012, down from over 5.3 million in 1991. However, the number of junior high schools has remained relatively static, falling from 11,275 in 1993 to 10,699 in 2012. The number of junior high school teachers has also changed little, with 257,605 junior high school teachers in 1996, and 253,753 in 2012). Approximately 8% of junior high students attend a private junior high school (accounting for 7% of all junior high schools). Private schools are considerably more expensive: as of 2013, the average annual cost of private primary school attendance was ¥1,295,156 per student, roughly thrice the ¥450,340 cost for a public school. Japan's compulsory education ends at grade nine, but less than 2% drop out; 60% of students advanced to senior education as of 1960, increasing rapidly to over 90% by 1980, rising further each year until reaching 98.3% as of 2012.

Teachers often major in their respective subjects, and more than 79% graduate from a four-year college. Classes are large, with an average of thirty-eight students per class, and each class is assigned a homeroom teacher, doubling as a counselor. Unlike kindergarten students, primary school students have different teachers for different subjects. However, the teacher changes rooms for each period, rather than the students.

Instruction in primary schools is often in the form of lectures. Teachers also use other Media, such as television and Radio, and there is some laboratory work. By 1989 about 45% of all public primary schools had computers, including schools that used them only for administrative purposes. All course contents are specified in the Course of Study for Lower-Secondary Schools.  Some subjects, such as Japanese language and mathematics, are coordinated with the elementary curriculum. Others, such as foreign-language study, begin at this level, though from April 2011, English became a compulsory part of the elementary school curriculum. The junior school curriculum covers Japanese language, social studies, mathematics, science, music, fine arts, health, and physical education. All students are also exposed to industrial arts and homemaking. Moral education and special activities continue to receive attention. Most students also participate in one of a range of school clubs that occupy them until around 6 p.m. most weekdays (including weekends and often before school as well), as part of an effort to address juvenile delinquency..

A growing number of primary school students also attend juku, private extracurricular study schools, in the evenings and on weekends. A focus by students upon these other studies and the increasingly structured demands upon students' time have been criticized by teachers and in the media for contributing to a decline in classroom standards and student performance in recent years.

The ministry recognizes a need to improve the teaching of all foreign languages, especially English. To improve instruction in spoken English, the government invites many young native speakers of English to Japan to serve as assistants to school boards and prefectures under its Japan Exchange and Teaching Program (JET). Beginning with 848 participants in 1987, the program grew to a high of 6,273 participants in 2002.  The program was in a decline in recent years due to several factors, including shrinking local school budgets funding the program, as well as an increasing number of school boards hiring their foreign native speakers directly or through lower-paying, private agencies.  Today, the program is again growing due to English becoming a compulsory part of the elementary school curriculum in 2011/21**.

Upper secondary school

Though upper-secondary school is not compulsory in Japan, 94% of all junior high school graduates enrolled as of 2005. Upper secondary consists of three years. Private upper-secondary schools account for about 55% of all upper-secondary schools, and neither public nor private schools are free. The Ministry of Education estimated that annual family expenses for the education of a child in a public upper-secondary school were about ¥300,000 in the 1980s and that private upper-secondary schools were about twice as expensive.

The most common type of upper-secondary school has a full-time, general program that offered academic courses for students preparing for higher education as well as technical and vocational courses for students expecting to find employment after graduation. More than 70% of upper-secondary school students were enrolled in the general academic program in the late 1980s. A small number of schools offer part-time programs, evening courses, or correspondence education.

The first-year programs for students in both academic and commercial courses are similar. They include basic academic courses, such as Japanese language, English, mathematics, and science. In upper-secondary school, differences in ability are first publicly acknowledged, and course content and course selection are far more individualized in the second year. However, there is a core of academic material throughout all programs.

Vocational-technical programs includes several hundred specialized courses, such as information processing, navigation, fish farming, business, English, and ceramics. Business and industrial courses are the most popular, accounting for 72% of all students in full-time vocational programs in 1989.

Most upper-secondary teachers are university graduates. Upper-secondary schools are organized into departments, and teachers specialize in their major fields although they teach a variety of courses within their disciplines. Teaching depends largely on the lecture system, with the main goal of covering the very demanding curriculum in the time allotted. Approach and subject coverage tends to be uniform, at least in the public schools.

Training of disabled students, particularly at the upper-secondary level, emphasizes vocational education to enable students to be as independent as possible within society. Vocational training varies considerably depending on the student's disability, but the options are limited for some. It is clear that the government is aware of the necessity of broadening the range of possibilities for these students. Advancement to higher education is also a goal of the government, and it struggles to have institutions of higher learning accept more students with disabilities.

Higher and tertiary education

Higher and tertiary educations in Japan are provided in universities (daigaku), junior colleges (tanki daigaku), colleges of technology (koto senmon gakko) and special training colleges (senmon gakko). Of these four types of institutions, only universities and junior colleges are strictly considered as higher education.

As of 2017, more than 2.89 million students were enrolled in 780 universities. At the top of the higher education structure, these institutions provide a four-year training leading to a bachelor's degree, and some offer six-year programs leading to a professional degree. There are two types of public four-year colleges: the 86 national universities (including the Open University of Japan) and the 95 local public universities, founded by prefectures and municipalities. The 597 remaining four-year colleges in 2010 were private. With a wealth of opportunities for students wishing to pursue tertiary education, the nation's prestigious schools are the most appealing for students seeking to gain top employment prospects.

The overwhelming majority of college students attend full-time day programs. In 1990 the most popular courses, enrolling almost 40 percent of all undergraduate students, were in the social sciences, including business, law, and accounting. Other popular subjects were engineering (19 percent), the humanities (15 percent), and education (7 percent).

The average costs (tuition, fees, and living expenses) for a year of higher education in 1986 were ¥1.4 million. To help defray expenses, students frequently work part-time or borrow money through the government-supported Japan Scholarship Association. Assistance is also offered by local governments, non-profit corporations, and other institutions.

The quality of universities and higher education in Japan is internationally recognized. There are 50 Japanese universities listed on the 2022 THES - QS World University Rankings, with the University of Tokyo ranked 23rd and Kyoto University ranked at 36th. In 2022, the QS Asia University Rankings Top 20 included four Japanese universities, with the highest ranking, the University of Tokyo, in 6th position.

The 2022 QS Asia University Rankings Top 40 included the University of Tokyo at the 6th position, Kyoto University at 9th, Tokyo Institute of Technology at 16th, and Osaka University at 18th.

Compulsory school subjects 
The following is the set of compulsory subjects currently taught in the Japanese education system from the primary to secondary levels:

 Japanese (the national language) (plus one other language, mainly English)
 Arithmetic, mathematics, etc.
 Science, technology, etc.
 Foreign languages: Korean, (rarely: Arabic, French, German, or Chinese)
 Social studies (history, geography, and civics).
 Physical education (health, sports, etc.)
 Moral education (usually taught in the primary school levels).
 Informatics, technology, etc.
 Home economics, technology, etc.

In Japanese elementary, junior and senior secondary schools, textbooks that have passed the certification process from the Ministry of Education (MEXT) must be used.

Academic grading 
Japanese schools tend to follow different academic grading principles. Many universities use the following for assessments scores and marks:

Primary school levels 
Elementary school students (years 1 through 6) are expected to complete their compulsory primary school education (義務教育, gimu kyoiku) as well as pass the admissions examinations for junior high schools.

Secondary school levels 
In order for students to enter the secondary school level, students are required to sit for and pass the admissions examinations set by the schools. Failure indicates that students cannot proceed to secondary schools.

Secondary education in Japan is difficult in that it rigorously prepares students for university entrance. Many parents often send children to private cram schools known as juku (塾) in order to help prepare them for the university entrance examinations such as the National Centre Test (国立センター試験). Classes for juku are typically held in the evenings after students have completed their regular day courses.

Most secondary schools in Japan have a numerical grading system from 5 to 1 with 5 being the highest score.

Government intervention
Under the Basic Act on Education (2007) Japan has signed to provide equal opportunity in education including individuals with disabilities. Along with the Basic Act on Education, the Convention on the Rights of Persons with Disabilities (CRPD) was passed in 2007, and was ratified in 2014 as part of welfare.   These two acts promised that the national and local government would provide special needs education program with adequate accommodation according to their level of disability.   The purpose of the Special Needs Education is to help individuals develop their potential under their capabilities in order to gain independence and to gain vocational training in special fields. Some schools accommodate students with disability under traditional school settings, but in certain cases, students are placed in independent schools specialized in special needs education program.  This program supports students with visual impairment, hearing impairment, physical disability, emotional behavioural disorder, learning disabilities, speech-language impairment (communication disorder), health impairment and development delay.

Reforms

Children with disabilities, along with their parents, did not have a voice until in the 1990s when special needs education started to receive public attention. Before then, children with disability were recognized as "slow learners" or "difficult to blend in". The education department of the Japanese government slowly started to focus on giving equal rights to children with disability, and the first major reform began as an introduction of a "Resource Room System", which served as a supplemental special need program for students with disabilities attending traditional school settings. Further in 2006, a greater educational reform took place to promote the notion of "inclusive education". The inclusion education program came into act due to an influence of three political factors; the international movement for school inclusion, the reform of welfare on people with disabilities, and a general reform of the education system in Japan. The purpose of this act was to avoid isolation of students with disability with the rest of the mainstream society, and integrate special need education with traditional education system by providing a more universal and diverse classroom settings. In recent years, the Japanese government continues to pass equal rights to children with disability under special need education and inclusive education as public welfare.

Extracurricular activities 
The Japanese educational system is supplemented by a heavy emphasis on extracurricular activities, also known as shadow education, which are any educational activities that do not take place during formal schooling. This is largely motivated by the extreme weight that is placed upon formal examinations as a prerequisite to attend university, something that is seen as integral to their future career and social status. In order to gain a competitive edge, Japanese families are willing to expend money and have their child put in time and effort into a supplementary education. Forms of shadow education include mogi shiken, which are practice exams given by private companies that determine the child's chances of getting into a university. Juku are private after school classes that aim to develop abilities for students to excel in formal school curriculum or to prepare for university examinations. Ronin are students that undergo full-time preparation for university exams following high school due to their inability to get into their school of choice.

Over 86% of students with college plans participate in at least one form of shadow education, with 60% participating in two or more.

Criticisms
Japanese students are faced with immense pressure to succeed academically from their parents, teachers, peers and society. This is largely a result of a society that has long placed a great amount of importance on education, and a system that places all of its weight upon a single examination that has significant life-long consequences. This pressure has led to behaviors such as school violence, cheating, suicide, and significant psychological harm. In some cases, students have experienced nervous breakdowns that have required hospitalization as young as twelve. In 1991, it was reported that 1,333 people in the age group of 15–24 had killed themselves, much of which was due to academic pressure. In an international perspective, teenage suicide rates are close to the OECD average and below those of the United States. A survey by the Education Ministry showed that students at public schools were involved in a record number of violent incidents in 2007: 52,756 cases, an increase of some 8,000 on the previous year. In almost 7,000 of these incidents, teachers were the target of assault.

The Japanese educational system has also been criticized for failure to foster independent thinkers with cultural and artistic sensibility. Japanese students that attend schools overseas often face difficulty adapting and competing in that environment due to lack of international viewpoints.

There is also criticism about the amount of free time students are given and/or are allowed within their middle school and high school careers. As Japanese students grow, their time to assert what they have learned in class to real life is cut dramatically, starting with the elevation from elementary to lower secondary school. A large part of this has to do with cram schooling, or Juku, which can start as early as elementary and takes full effect toward the end of junior high school, with roughly 60% of all students participating. This number has increased drastically over the past couple decades, as well as the view of Juku within the Japanese academic system. While initially seen as a problem, cram schools have become synonymous with Japan's schooling and are even seen as a support to the structure of said schooling. With Juku costing between 600,000 to 1.5 million yen, depending on how old the student is and how much the guardian can pay, cram school is a very profitable part of the economy, with over 48,000 Juku schools active today. With these extra school sessions ranging between 1 to 6 days a week on top of normal classes, there is a fear that students will be unable to incorporate what they have learned into their lives, and thus could foreseeably lose the retained knowledge once the Entrance Exams are over.

Bullying
There is criticism about insufficient efforts to reduce bullying in schools. In fiscal 2019, there were a record 612,496 bullying cases in schools across Japan. This includes public, private elementary, junior high, high schools and special schools for children with disabilities. Serious incidents with severe physical or psychological damage was 723 (20% increase from 2018). Bullying happens mostly on elementary schools (484,545 cases in 2019) followed by junior high schools (106,524 cases in 2019) and high schools (18,352 cases in 2019). In fiscal 2019, 317 students died from suicide of which 10 suffered from bullying. 61.9 percent of cases were verbal bullying and online bullying accounted for 18.9 percent in high schools. In 2019 there were 78,787 cases of violent acts by students in elementary, junior high and high schools.

International education
As of 2016, Japan has 30 to 40 international schools. There are many Kindergarten type schools that use the word "international" in their names but this is not an indicator that they are Japanese schools in the traditional sense. United Nations University is located in Japan and Temple University has a branch campus in Japan. International University of Japan is an internationally top-ranked, fully English-taught University in Japan. Akita International University is also an English-taught University. Sophia University's Faculty of Liberal Arts and the Sophia Program for Sustainable Futures are fully taught in English. Tokyo University of Foreign Studies is a highly selective, specialist institution for International Studies and offers some languages that are rarely taught elsewhere in the world.

Top Global University Project 

In 2018, the Ministry of Education implemented the Top Global University Project (TGU) to provide prioritised support to universities leading Japan in the process of internationalisation and collaborative research. The project aims to reform existing personnel and education systems, deepen interactions with other leading universities and research institutions around the globe, and accelerate other educational globalisation initiatives. 13 universities were selected as Type A (Top Type) to lead Japan in world-leading research and education. 24 universities were selected as Top B (Global Traction Type) to help Japan become a more internationalised society.

TGU selected universities

See also

Curriculum guideline
Eikaiwa school
Japanese history textbook controversies
Japanese graduation ceremony
Japanese school uniform
Language minority students in Japanese classrooms
Yutori education

Notes

References

Further reading
 De Bary, William Theodore, Carol Gluck, Arthur E. Tiedemann. (2005). Sources of Japanese Tradition, Vol. 2. New York: Columbia University Press. ; OCLC 255020415
 Hebert, David G. (2011). Wind Bands and Cultural Identity in Japanese Schools. Springer press, 2011.
 Hood, Christopher P. Japanese Education Reform: Nakasone's Legacy, 2001, London: Routledge, .
 Kelly, Boyd. (1999). Encyclopedia of Historians and Historical Writing, Vol. 1. London: Taylor & Francis. 
 Passow, A. Harry et al. The National Case Study: An Empirical Comparative Study of Twenty-One Educational Systems.  (1976) online 
 Uno, Kathleen S.  (1999). Passages to Modernity: Motherhood, Childhood, and Social Reform in Early Twentieth Century Japan. Hawai'i: University of Hawai'i Press. , .

Journal articles, conference papers, and other papers like The Times Colonist
 
 
 Takahashi, Akihiko (高橋　昭彦; DePaul University). "." CRICED Mathematics Symposium, 2006.

External links

Ministry of Education, Culture, Sports, Science and Technology
 Information on education in Japan, OECD – contains indicators and information about Japan and how it compares to other OECD and non-OECD countries
 Diagram of Japanese education system, OECD – using 1997 ISCED classification of programmes and typical ages. (Also available in romanized Japanese.)

Education in Japan
Japanese values